The 2019 Reign FC season is the club's seventh season of play and their seventh season in the National Women's Soccer League, the top division of women's soccer in the United States. It is the club's first season playing in Tacoma, Washington, following the relocation from Seattle and rebrand from Seattle Reign FC.

This is the NWSL's first season with the increased standard roster size from 20 to 22. In addition, there are now four supplemental roster spots for players making the minimum salary that do not count against the team salary cap. Teams now must carry at least 20 players at any given time and could carry as many as 26 players.

Club

Coaching staff

Current roster

Competitions 

All times are in PT unless otherwise noted.

Preseason

Thorns Spring Invitational

Regular season

Regular-season standings

Results summary

Results by matchday

Playoffs

Appearances and goals

|-
|colspan="14"|Goalkeepers:
|-

|-
|colspan="14"|Defenders:
|-

|-
|colspan="14"|Midfielders:
|-

|-
|colspan="14"|Forwards:
|-

|-
|colspan="14"|Players who left the club during the season:
|-

|-
|colspan="14"|Own goals for:

|-

Transfers
For transfers in, dates listed are when Reign FC officially signed the players to the roster. Transactions where only the rights to the players are acquired (e.g., draft picks) are not listed. For transfers out, dates listed are when Reign FC officially removed the players from its roster, not when they signed with another club. If a player later signed with another club, her new club will be noted, but the date listed here remains the one when she was officially removed from the Reign FC roster.

Transfers in

Loans in

Transfers out

Loans out

New contracts

Awards

The Best FIFA Football Awards

 The Best FIFA Women's Player: Megan Rapinoe
 FIFA FIFPro Women's World11: Megan Rapinoe

2019 Ballon d'Or

 Ballon d'Or Féminin: Megan Rapinoe

SI Sportsperson of the Year

 2019 Sports Illustrated Sportsperson of the Year: Megan Rapinoe

The Guardian Footballer of the Year

 2019 The Guardian Footballer of the Year: Megan Rapinoe

The Guardian 100 Best Footballers in The World

 No. 3: Megan Rapinoe

NWSL Players' Awards

 Players' Rookie of the Year: Bethany Balcer

NWSL season awards

 Coach of the Year: Vlatko Andonovski
 Second XI: Bethany Balcer, Lauren Barnes, Megan Rapinoe
 Rookie of the Year: Bethany Balcer
 Defender of the Year: Lauren Barnes (finalist)
 Goalkeeper of the Year: Casey Murphy (finalist)

Club season awards
Announced on October 25, 2019.

 Most Valuable Player: Bev Yanez
 Defender of the Year: Lauren Barnes
 Newcomer of the Year: Bethany Balcer
 Golden Boot: Bethany Balcer (6)

NWSL Player of the Month

NWSL Team of the Month

NWSL Player of the Week

NWSL Goal of the Week

NWSL Save of the Week

References

External links 

OL Reign seasons
2019 in sports in Washington (state)
2019 National Women's Soccer League season
American soccer clubs 2019 season
Sports in Tacoma, Washington